Tooting Priory or Tooting Bec Priory was a priory in Tooting, now in the London Borough of Wandsworth. It was dissolved before 1315 and the land was granted to Eton College in 1440.

References

Monasteries in London
Tooting